The Estonian Knighthood was a fiefdom that operated in the northern part of modern Estonia. It was formed in 1584 by the Baltic German nobles and disbanded in 1920. Just like other Baltic knighthoods, the Estonian also had semi-autonomous privileged status in the Russian Empire.

The earliest written reference of the Estonian Knighthood dates from 1252. Its origins date back to the time of Danish rule, when the northern Estonian provinces of Revala, Vironia and Harria where allied together. The process of the development of the corporation into a political entity was completed by the end of the Rule of the Teutonic Order in 1561, resulting in the control of the region and its peasant population, excluding the cities. 

Estonian Knighthood managed to maintain its dominant role throughout the period of Swedish and Russian rule. This meant that the practice of the Protestant-Lutheran faith (of the Augsburg Confession) was guaranteed along with the use of German as the administrative language and local autonomy in the administration of the land and the application of the law to its German and Estonian population.

See also
Estonian Knighthood House
Governorate of Estonia
Livonian Knighthood
Curonian Knighthood
Saaremaa Knighthood

References

 
 
Geographic history of Estonia
1584 establishments in Europe
1920 disestablishments in Europe